Damas-et-Bettegney is a commune in the Vosges department in Grand Est in northeastern France.

See also
Communes of the Vosges department

References

Communes of Vosges (department)
Vosges communes articles needing translation from French Wikipedia